This is a list of gangs whose members are associated with the Los Angeles County Sheriff's Department (LASD) (typically deputies). Press reports indicate the LASD has had a problem with gangs since at least the 1970s and now has around eighteen gangs. The department has used the term "cliques" when discussing these groups.

The 1992 Kolts Commission report said these were found “particularly at stations in areas heavily populated by minorities—the so-called ‘ghetto stations'—and deputies at those stations recruit persons similar in attitude to themselves.” The first deputy gang acknowledged by the LASD was the "Little Devils" in a later-released internal memo in 1973. However, one or more deputy gangs are believed to have been involved in the death of Los Angeles Times reporter and law enforcement critic Ruben Salazar during the National Chicano Moratorium March against the Vietnam War on August 29, 1970.

In July 2021, U.S. Representative Maxine Waters called for a United States Department of Justice investigation into allegations that a violent deputy gang known as the Executioners was running the Compton station of the LASD.

A report released in early 2023 revealed that at lease six deputy gangs remain active.

List
 Banditos
 Buffalo Soldiers
 Cavemen
 Compton Executioners
 Cowboys
 Grim Reapers
 Jump Out Boys
 Little Devils
 Little Red Devils
 Lynwood Vikings
 Pirates
 Posse
 Rattlesnakes
 Regulators
 Spartans
 Tasmanian Devils
 3000 Boys
 2000 Boys
 Temple Station V-Boys
 Wayside Whities

References

Los Angeles County Sheriff's Department
Gangs in Los Angeles
Lists of gangs
Police misconduct in the United States